Paul Thomas Tierney (born 15 September 1982) is a former professional footballer. His brother Marc is also a former professional footballer. Born in England, he represented the Republic of Ireland U21 team.

Club career
Born in Salford, Greater Manchester, Tierney signed for Manchester United as a trainee in July 1999 and as a professional 12 months later. He was loaned out to Crewe Alexandra (where he scored his first career goal against Blackpool), Colchester United, and Bradford City. He made his senior debut for Manchester United on 3 December 2003 against West Bromwich Albion in the League Cup. He signed for Livingston on 16 June 2005 having been released by Manchester United, but failed to impress in his first season at the club and they were relegated from the Scottish Premier League. He joined Blackpool on 2 June 2006 on a free transfer.

In July 2007, Blackpool manager Simon Grayson allowed Tierney to join Stockport County in a six-month loan deal. At Stockport he scored once against Macclesfield in the Football League Trophy. Tierney returned to Blackpool in January 2008, and in May 2008, he was released by the club. In September 2008 he signed for Conference National club Altrincham. However, he left the club after less than a month.

International career
Tierney made his debut for the Republic of Ireland under-21s against Italy in the 2002 Toulon Tournament. He made three appearances during Ireland's qualifying campaign for the 2004 UEFA European Under-21 Championship, with his last cap coming in the draw with Georgia in March 2003.

Personal life
Paul is the brother of former Bolton Wanderers player Marc Tierney.

Honours
Blackpool
League One play-off final winner 2006–07
Individual
 Jimmy Murphy Young Player of the Year (1): 2001–02

References

External links

 The Ballad Of Paul Tierney by Lonely Tourist

1982 births
Living people
People from Salford
Republic of Ireland association footballers
Manchester United F.C. players
Crewe Alexandra F.C. players
Colchester United F.C. players
Bradford City A.F.C. players
Livingston F.C. players
Blackpool F.C. players
Stockport County F.C. players
Scottish Premier League players
English Football League players
National League (English football) players
Association football fullbacks